Mariya Vladimirovna Pogrebnyak (born 1 July 1996) is a Russian rugby sevens player. She competed in the women's tournament at the 2020 Summer Olympics.

References

External links
 

1996 births
Living people
Russian female rugby sevens players
Olympic rugby sevens players of Russia
Rugby sevens players at the 2020 Summer Olympics
People from Gatchina
Sportspeople from Leningrad Oblast